Washes Whiter Than is the third studio album by the Christian rock band Petra. It was released in 1979 amidst major line-up changes that saw all but one of the founding band members leave.

The album features a more mellow style when compared to the band's two previous efforts. Part of the reason for this is that the group wanted to get away from the controversy surrounding the hard rock style of their earlier releases. The softer material on this record achieved greater airplay on Christian radio stations than had their previous albums. This is also the first release to feature singer Greg X. Volz as an official band member. Musician Rob Frazier, who later went on to have a solo career, is also featured as lead vocalist in several of the songs, as well as playing most of the instrumentation together with founder Bob Hartman.

The album was reissued by Star Song Records on a 2-on-1 CD package together with 1981's Never Say Die. The songs "(Couldn't Find Love) Without You" and "Magic Words" were cut from this edition to save space.

Track listing

 Tracks 7 and 9 were excluded from the album's CD release

Personnel 
Petra
 Bob Hartman – lead guitar, rhythm guitar, backing vocals, track arrangements
 Greg X. Volz – lead vocals (1, 4, 6, 8), backing vocals
 Rob Frazier – lead vocals (1–3, 5–7, 9–10), backing vocals, keyboards, guitars, track arrangements

Additional musicians
 George Atwell – keyboards, track arrangements, horn and string arrangements, conductor
 Gerald Byron – guitars
 Joel Balin – guitars
 Chip Meyers – bass
 Randy Nichols – drums, percussion
 Bob Prince

Production
 George Atwell – producer
 Dan R. Brock – album direction
 Andy deGanahl – engineer at Bee Jay Recording Studios, Orlando, Florida
 George Werth – album design, artwork
 Allen Zentz – mastering at Allen Zentz Recording, Hollywood, California

Notes

1979 albums
Petra (band) albums